was a politician and bureaucrat in the early Shōwa period Japan, who subsequently was a politician and cabinet minister in the immediate post-war era.

Biography
Ōmura was born in Tsuyama, Okayama. After his graduation from the Law School of Kyoto Imperial University, he entered the Home Ministry. He served as Governor of Nagano Prefecture from 15 January 1935 to 13 March 1936, and again for a second term from 11 January 1938 to 23 December 1938. He was then appointed Governor of Kanagawa Prefecture from 23 December 1938 to 4 September 1939. Later in 1939, he was Vice Minister for Education under Prime Minister Abe Nobuyuki. In 1943, he was made chairman of the Japan Student Services Organization.

After the end of World War II, during the American occupation of Japan, Ōmura served as Home Minister in the first Yoshida administration from 22 May 1946 to 24 May 1947. He was also appointed to a seat in the House of Peers in the Diet of Japan.

From 10 December 1954 to 19 March 1955, Ōmura served as Director-General for the Japan Defense Agency under the first Hatoyama administration.

Ōmura subsequently was elected a seat in the Lower House of the Diet from his native Okayama, and served for six terms from 21 November 1960 to 23 October 1963. He was awarded the Grand Cordon of the Order of the Sacred Treasure on 29 April 1965.

References
 Woodard, William Parsons.  The Allied Occupation of Japan: 1945-1952 and Japanese Religions. Brill (1972). AISI v9IUAAAAIAAJ
Kono,Masaru.  Japan’s Postwar Party Politics. Princeton University Press. (1997) 
Hunter, Janet.  A Concise Dictionary of Modern Japanese History . University of California Press (1994). 

1892 births
1968 deaths
People from Okayama Prefecture
Kyoto University alumni
Kagoshima University alumni
Government ministers of Japan
Ministers of Home Affairs of Japan
Members of the House of Peers (Japan)
Members of the House of Representatives (Japan)
Governors of Nagano
Governors of Kanagawa Prefecture
Japanese defense ministers